Colton High School is an American public high school in Colton, California. It is located just north of Interstate 10 at Rancho Avenue. Colton High School opened in 1895 as the first High School of the Colton School District. It is one of five High Schools in the district.

The school draws students from the city of Colton, as well as Grand Terrace and a small section of San Bernardino. The school is identified as a national AVID demonstration school, and was named a 2011 AP District of the Year in the midsize category by the College Board. Out of 1240 high schools in California, Colton ranks 1139 placing it in lowest 10%.

Sports
In the 2010 Fall football season, the Yellowjackets won the CIF Championship, the first time since 1979.

Notable athletes
Anthony Hamilton (soccer) of the Chivas USA
Rich Dauer of the Baltimore Orioles 
Jay Dahl Major League Baseball pitcher for Houston Colt 45s 
Kevinn Pinkney of the Boston Celtics
Allen Bradford of the Seattle Seahawks
Daniel Sorensen of the Kansas City Chiefs
Shareece Wright of the Baltimore Ravens
Nat Berhe of the New York Giants
Jimmy Smith of the Baltimore Ravens
Ken Hubbs was baseball's 1962 National League Rookie of the Year for the Chicago Cubs
Tyler Ervin of the Green Bay Packers

References

 

High schools in San Bernardino County, California
Public high schools in California
Colton, California
1872 establishments in California